Takamimusubi (高御産巣日神, lit. "High Creator") is a god of agriculture in Japanese mythology, who was the second of the first beings to come into existence.

It is speculated that Takamimusubi was originally the tutelary deity for the Japanese imperial family. According to the Kojiki, Takamimusubi was a hitorigami.

Mythology 
According to Kojiki, when the heaven and earth were created, Ame-no-Minakanushi was the first one to appear in Takamagahara, Takamimusubi the second, and Kamimusubi the third.

One myth tells of a bird named Nakime who was sent down to earth to check in on Amewakahiko. Amewakahiko shot the bird with his bow. The arrow pierced through the bird, but the arrow flew all the way to heaven. Takamimusubi saw the arrow and threw it back at the earth where it hit Amewakahiko while he was laying in bed, killing him.

Family 
He is the father of several gods including Takuhadachiji-hime(栲幡千千姫), Omoikane, Futodama (some versions Takammusubi is the grandfather of Futodama) and some versions Ame-no-oshihomimi. According to Nihon Shoki, he is the father of Sukunabikona.

According to Shinsen Shōjiroku, he is the grandfather of Tamanoya.

In one version of the Nihon Shoki, Mihotsuhime(三穂津姫) is the daughter of Takamimusubi.

He is the grandfather of Ninigi-no-Mikoto, who descended on Ashihara no Nakatsukuni first as a member of the Imperial Family and was a grandson of Amaterasu, according to the Nihon Shoki.

Worship 
Izumo-taisha is one of the shrines dedicated to Takamimusubi.

Hasshinden was once a temple that enshrined him.

See also

References 

Shinto
Japanese mythology
Agricultural gods
Amatsukami